Lynsore Bottom is a  biological Site of Special Scientific Interest north of Folkestone in Kent.

These coppice with standards woods have a variety of tree species. The ground flora is diverse, and the woods are also important for their breeding birds, including tawny owls, grasshopper warblers and hawfinches.

The woods are crossed by public footpaths.

References

Sites of Special Scientific Interest in Kent